Samantha Jane Graham (born 27 May 1969) is a South African politician from the Eastern Cape who was elected to the National Assembly of South Africa in the 2019 general election as a member of the Democratic Alliance. Graham has been the party's shadow minister of public works and infrastructure since December 2020. Graham served as the shadow deputy minister of public works and infrastructure from 2019 to 2020. She is a former councillor of the Dr Beyers Naudé Local Municipality.

Early life and education
Samantha Jane Graham was born on 27 May 1969. She matriculated from Rhenish Girls' High School in Stellenbosch in 1986.  In December 2021, Graham graduated cum laude from the University of South Africa with a Bachelor of Laws (LLB).

Political career
Graham became a member of the Democratic Alliance in 2007. Only in 2009, she became an active member of the party. She then formed a branch in Aberdeen and got elected as the branch chairperson.

For the May 2011 municipal elections, she stood as a DA ward councillor candidate, but narrowly lost to the African National Congress candidate. She was then appointed as a PR councillor. Graham was selected as the DA's mayoral candidate for the newly established Dr Beyers Naudé Local Municipality ahead of the 2016 municipal elections. The ANC narrowly retained control of the municipality and Graham was elected as a PR councillor.

During her tenure on the Dr Beyers Naudé local council, she was the DA's caucus leader, the Portfolio Chairperson on Corporate Services and a member of the municipality's executive committee. Graham is also a member of the DA's provincial council and the provincial disciplinary committee.

Parliamentary career
Prior to the 8 May 2019 general elections, Graham was placed 6th on the DA's regional list, 77th on its national list and 23rd on its provincial list. She was elected to the National Assembly on the regional list. She became a Member of Parliament on 22 May 2019.

On 5 June 2019, the DA parliamentary leader, Mmusi Maimane, appointed her as shadow deputy minister of public works and infrastructure. Shortly afterwards, she was appointed as the DA's constituency leader for the Dr Beyers Naude municipality. Graham became a member of the Portfolio Committee on Public Works and Infrastructure on 27 June 2019.

Graham was appointed Shadow Minister of Public Works and Infrastructure in December 2020, succeeding Patricia Kopane.

In February 2023, Graham was elected as one of three deputy provincial chairpersons of the DA.

Personal life
Graham was previously married to Nikolas Jankovich. They have two children from the marriage. She and her family moved from Cape Town to Aberdeen, Eastern Cape in December 2008. In October 2010, she was diagnosed with breast cancer. She finished her chemotherapy  10 days before the May 18, 2011 local elections. Graham and her family moved to Graaff-Reinet in 2012. In July 2018, Graham was diagnosed with a recurrence of breast cancer. She then had a double mastectomy in August.

She married Rodney Maré in May 2019.

References

Living people
1969 births
White South African people
People from the Eastern Cape
Democratic Alliance (South Africa) politicians
Members of the National Assembly of South Africa
21st-century South African politicians
Women members of the National Assembly of South Africa